Urban Daydreams is an album by American pianist David

Benoit released in 1989, recorded for the GRP label. The album reached #3 on Billboard'''s Contemporary Jazz chart.

Track listing
All tracks composed by David Benoit; except where indicated
"Sailing Through the City" (Don Grusin) - 5:12
"Cloud Break" - 4:24
"Urban Daydreams" - 5:48
"When the Winter's Gone" (David Benoit, David Pack, Jennifer Warnes) - 4:11
"Snow Dancing" - 5:51
"Safari" (David Benoit, Don Grusin) - 5:11
"Wild Kids" (David Benoit, Don Grusin) - 4:22
"Looking Back" - 2:09
"Seattle Morning" - 4:06
"As If I Could Reach Rainbows" - 3:51

"Wild Kids" was written as the theme for the This is America, Charlie Brown'' episode "The Great Inventors".

Personnel 
 David Benoit – acoustic piano (1-10), keyboards (1, 2, 3), arrangements (1, 3, 6, 7, 8), orchestra conductor (3, 8), synthesizer programming (5, 6, 8)
 Don Grusin – synthesizer programming (1, 2, 3, 5-8), arrangements (1, 6, 7), drum programming (3, 6, 8), keyboards (4, 7)
 Oscar Castro-Neves – acoustic guitar (6)
 Jimmy Johnson – bass (1, 2, 3, 5, 7, 8, 9)
 Abraham Laboriel – bass (4)
 Carlos Vega – drums (1, 2, 3, 5, 7, 8, 9)
 Alex Acuña – drums (4)
 Eric Marienthal – alto saxophone (1, 5), soprano saxophone (6, 7)
 Gary Herbig – alto saxophone (8), clarinet (8)
 Judd Miller – electronic valve instrument (1, 2, 3, 6, 8)
 Bruce Dukov – concertmaster (3, 8)
 Gina Kronstadt – orchestra contractor (3, 8)
 The Warfield Avenue Symphony Orchestra (3, 8)
 Jennifer Warnes – vocals (4)

Production 
 David Benoit – producer
 Don Grusin – producer, executive producer 
 Larry Rosen – executive producer 
 Don Murray – engineer, mixing 
 Leslie Ann Jones – additional engineer
 Wally Traugott – mastering 
 Suzanne Sherman – production coordinator 
 Andy Baltimore – creative director, graphic design, front and back cover photography 
 David Gibb – graphic design
 Dave Kunze – graphic design
 Dan Serrano – graphic design
 Mitchell Hartman – front and back illustration 
 Chris Cuffaro – black and white photography
 Mixed and Mastered at Capitol Studios (Hollywood, California).

Charts

References

External links
David Benoit-Urban Daydreams at Discogs
David Benoit-Urban Daydreams at AllMusic

1989 albums
GRP Records albums
David Benoit (musician) albums